William Maldwyn "Mal" Griffiths (8 March 1919 – 5 April 1969) was a Welsh footballer who played as an outside right for Leicester City and Wales.

Born in Merthyr Tydfil, Griffiths started out in local football before signing for Arsenal. After a spell at Arsenal's nursery club Margate he returned to the senior team and played nine league games (scoring five goals) in 1937–38 as Arsenal won the old First Division.

He moved to Leicester City for the 1938–39 season, and went on to play 373 League games for the Foxes over the next 18 years. He also made 36 FA Cup appearances for Leicester, and along with wartime games, his overall total appearances numbered 420, with 79 goals scored. He finished his career with Burton Albion.

Griffiths also won eleven caps for Wales, scoring two goals.

References

1919 births
1969 deaths
Footballers from Merthyr Tydfil
Welsh footballers
English Football League players
Wales international footballers
Association football outside forwards
Arsenal F.C. players
Leicester City F.C. players
Burton Albion F.C. players
FA Cup Final players